Sugandha River is a river in Bangladesh in the  Barisal and Jhalokati District districts. The length of the river is 21 km, and the average width is 400m. The identification number of the river given by the Bangladesh Water Development Board is River No. 377 in the south-western region, and the flow type is perennial.

Flow
The Sugandha River originates from the Kirtankhola River flowing in the Dapadapiya Union area of Nalchiti Upazila in Jhalokati District. The river then flows through Magra, Nalchiti Municipality, Kulkati and Ponabalia Unions and then flows up to Gabkhan Dhansindri Union in Jhalokati Sadar Upazila of Jhalokati District and falls into Bishkhali River. The downstream side is wider than the river upstream. The river is flooded all year round and small boats ply. However, during the monsoon, the flow of water in the river increases more than usual. At that time the river bank area was flooded. The river is affected by low tide. This river is recognized as a first class waterway by the Bangladesh Inland Water Transport Authority.

History 
In November 2021, a ship exploded at a depot on the river operated by the Padma Oil Company killing one and injuring seven others.

In December 2021, a large ferry fire occurred on the river near the town of Jhalokati, killing 41 and injuring 100+ others.

See Also
 List of rivers in Bangladesh

References

 Rivers of Bangladesh